Pumlumon Cwmbiga is a summit of the Pumlumon mountain range in Ceredigion, Wales. It is 620 metres (2,034) feet above sea level and is a deleted Nuttall, only just missing out on the criteria.
The nearby summit of Carnfachbugeilyn is slightly higher at 622 metres (2,041 feet).

References

Mountains and hills of Ceredigion